The British Commonwealth Junior Heavyweight Championship was a professional wrestling championship that although being created in England, it gained its biggest notoriety in Japan. Not long after its creation the title made its way to Michinoku Pro Wrestling where it stayed until Jushin Thunder Liger took it to New Japan Pro-Wrestling and combined it with seven other Junior Heavyweight Belts to create the J-Crown. After the J-Crown was disbanded the title resurfaced in England for a short time. After a tour of England Tiger Mask took the title back to Japan, where it returned to Michinoku Pro then made its way to Toryumon, where it was last defended before becoming Inactive.

Title history

See also

Professional wrestling in the United Kingdom

References

External links
http://www.wrestling-titles.com/japan/michinoku/bc-j.html - History at wrestling-titles                                                                    
http://www.titlehistories.com/British_Commonwealth_Junior_Heavyweight_Title.htm

Junior heavyweight wrestling championships
National professional wrestling championships
Professional wrestling in the United Kingdom